Macrolepiota albuminosa, or termite mushroom, is a species of agaric fungus in the family Agaricaceae that is an obligate symbiont of termites. The fruit bodies (mushrooms) of the fungus are edible. It is found growing from termitaria in grassy fields, on hillsides, and in forest borders in China, Vietnam, India and elsewhere.

Taxonomy
First described scientifically as Agaricus albuminosus by the English mycologist Miles Joseph Berkeley in 1847, it was transferred to the genus Termitomyces in 1941 by the French botanist Roger Heim and in 1972, to the genus Macrolepiota by the British mycologist David Pegler. It appears in the scientific literature under all these names.

Description
Remnants of the veil form a ring near the top of the stem. The cap is conical at first, becoming umbonate (with a knobby protrusion at the centre) as it opens out and flattening with age, sometimes splitting at the edges. The skin of the cap peels readily. The cap is whitish or pale tan, with a darker centre, the gills are white and the stem is white. The spore print is deep pink.

Ecology
Macrolepiota albuminosa is the fungus used by the termite species Odontotermes obesus in fungus gardens (also called combs) situated in their underground nests. The termites collect and chew up dead wood, leaf litter and other vegetable debris, depositing their faeces in the fungus garden situated in a central chamber of their nest. The hyphae of the fungus grow through the comb and the termites feed on the fungal threads. Periodically the fungus sends hyphae to the surface of the ground where mushroom-like fruiting bodies are formed. It is probable that the fungus is introduced into a newly established termite colony through the activities of the termites collecting spores from the environment. This fungus is edible and is collected from the wild in northern India in September, about a month later than the rather similar, but smaller Macrolepiota heimii.

Uses
This fungus grows in China in the provinces of Yunnan, Sichuan, Guizhou and Guangdong. It is described as being "fleshy, fat, fine silky white, crisp and refreshing, fresh and delicious,  and rich in nutrients". It is also used in traditional medicine for various purposes including enhancing the immune system, nourishing the blood and preventing bowel cancer. Attempts are being made to culture it in the laboratory under different conditions of temperature,  pH, and different sources of carbon and nitrogen to discover its optimal requirements.

References

Edible fungi
Fungi of Asia
Fungi described in 1847
Agaricaceae
Fungi of China
Taxa named by Miles Joseph Berkeley